Entephria is a genus in the geometer moth family (Geometridae). There is no unambiguous common name for these moths; like many other members of their subfamily Larentiinae, they are sometimes called "carpets". The genus was erected by Jacob Hübner in 1825.

Most of its roughly 50 species occur across the Holarctic; from Europe alone, 10 species have been recorded. But some others are found in Africa, and it is suspected that numerous others are presently misplaced in Perizoma and Scotopteryx. In the past, some authors have erroneously treated Entephria species under the genus name Dasyuris.

Selected species
Species of Entephria include:

Footnotes

References

"Entephria Hübner, 1825". Fauna Europaea. Retrieved May 7, 2019. 

Larentiini